Macroglossum marquesanum is a moth of the  family Sphingidae.

Distribution
This endemic species is known from the Marquesas Islands.

Description
These large moths have dark brown or brown-olive  head, thorax and abdomen. Forewings are brown, with three faintly defined transversal darker patches. Hindwings are yellowish.

Bibliography
Pinhey, E (1962): Hawk Moths of Central và Southern Africa. Longmans Southern Africa, Cape Town.
Pierre E. I. Viette - Catalogue of the Heterocerous Lepidoptera from French Oceania
A. M. Adamson Foreword - Review of the Fauna of the Marquesas Islands and Discussion of its Origin 
Christophe Avon - Sphingidae Bibliography (2016)
C. L. Collenette - The Arctiidae, Noctuidae and Sphingidae of the St. George Expedition from French Oceania

External links

 Sphingidae Taxonomic Inventory

References 

Macroglossum
Moths described in 1935